Fernando Monroy (born December 28, 1980)  is a Colombian football defender who recently played for Llaneros F.C.

References

External links
 BDFA profile

1980 births
Living people
Footballers from Cali
Colombian footballers
Colombian expatriate footballers
Deportivo Pasto footballers
Cortuluá footballers
Millonarios F.C. players
América de Cali footballers
Águilas Doradas Rionegro players
Alianza Atlético footballers
Atlético Bucaramanga footballers
Llaneros F.C. players
Categoría Primera A players
Categoría Primera B players
Expatriate footballers in Peru
Association football defenders